José Monteiro (Algarve) is a Paralympian athlete from Portugal competing mainly in category T46 middle-distance events.

José Monteiro competed in the 2000 Summer Paralympics in Sydney, Australia.  There he won a silver medal in the men's 800 metres - T46 event.  He also competed at the 2004 Summer Paralympics in Athens, Greece, finishing eighth in the men's 800 metres - T46 event and went out in the first round of the men's 1500 metres - T46 event.  He also competed at the 2008 Summer Paralympics in Beijing, China where he went out in the first round of the men's 800 metres - T46 event

References

External links
 

Paralympic athletes of Portugal
Athletes (track and field) at the 2000 Summer Paralympics
Athletes (track and field) at the 2004 Summer Paralympics
Athletes (track and field) at the 2008 Summer Paralympics
Paralympic silver medalists for Portugal
Living people
Medalists at the 2000 Summer Paralympics
Year of birth missing (living people)
Paralympic medalists in athletics (track and field)
Portuguese male middle-distance runners
Paralympic middle-distance runners